The Albania national under-17 football team represents Albania in international football at this age level in the FIFA U-17 World Cup and the UEFA European Under-17 Championship, as well as any other under-17 international football tournaments. It is controlled by Albanian Football Association, the governing body for football in Albania.

History

2016 UEFA European Under-17 Championship qualification

Group 1

2017 UEFA European Under-17 Championship qualification

Group 4

2018 UEFA European Under-17 Championship qualification

Group 2

Recent results

2023 UEFA European Under-17 Championship qualification

Group 8
</onlyinclude>

2023 UEFA European Under-17 Championship qualification Elite Round

Current squad
 The following players were called up for the 2023 UEFA European Under-17 Championship qualification Elite Round matches.
 Match dates: 22–28 March 2023
 Opposition: ,  and 
Caps and goals correct as of:26 October 2022, after the match against 

Joel Sala

Competitive record

UEFA European Under-17 Championship

*Denotes draws include knockout matches decided on penalty kicks.

See also
 Albania national football team
 Albania national under-23 football team
 Albania national under-21 football team
 Albania national under-20 football team
 Albania national under-19 football team
 Albania national under-18 football team
 Albania national under-16 football team
 Albania national under-15 football team
 Albania national football team results
 Albania national youth football team
 Albanian Superliga
 Football in Albania
 List of Albania international footballers
 UEFA European Under-17 Football Championship

References

External links
Albania national under-17 football team profile at Soccerway
Under-17 - Albania – UEFA.com
 

 

under-17
European national under-17 association football teams
Football in Albania